Massandra is an urban-type settlement in the Yalta Municipality in Crimea.

Massandra may also refer to:
 Massandra Accords, official agreements signed in 1993 between Ukraine and the Russian Federation 
 Massandra Palace,  Châteauesque villa of Emperor Alexander III of Russia in Crimea
 Massandra Winery, winery in Crimea
 3298 Massandra, a minor planet